Events from the year 1971 in art.

Events
 July 22 – The Lady of Baza Iberian sculpture (4th century BCE) is discovered.
 October 24 – English painter Francis Bacon's lover, George Dyer, commits suicide two days before the opening of the artist's retrospective at Paris's Grand Palais; Bacon will paint The Black Triptychs in his memory.
 Construction of the Centre Georges Pompidou in Paris begins.
 New Walker Art Center in Minneapolis, designed by Edward Larrabee Barnes, opens.

Awards
 Archibald Prize: Clifton Pugh – Sir John McEwen

Works

 Chris Burden - Shoot
 Abram Games – Stockwell tile motif on London Underground's Victoria line
 Hans Haacke – Real Time Social System
 David Hockney
 Mr and Mrs Clark and Percy
 Portrait of Sir David Webster
 Helen Journeay – Dawn (sculpture, Houston, Texas)
 Nabil Kanso – Place des Martyres (paintings) (1971 through 1974)
 Fritz Koenig – Great Spherical Caryatid ("The Sphere", for World Trade Center, New York City)
 John Raimondi – Cage
 Peter Sedgely – Pimlico tile motif on London Underground's Victoria line
 George Smith – Vauxhall tile motif on London Underground's Victoria line
 Kaapa Tjampitjinpa – Gulgardi
 Hans Unger – Brixton tile motif on London Underground's Victoria line
 Francisco Zúñiga – Mother and Daughter Seated (bronze, San Diego)

Exhibitions

 August 22 until September 29 - The De Luxe Show curated by  Peter Bradley at the De Luxe movie theater in Houston, Texas sponsored by the Menil Foundation.

Births
 January 4 – Junichi Kakizaki, Japanese floral artist and sculptor
 May 9 – Nicolas Ghesquière, French fashion designer
 June 1 – Miguel Calderón, Mexican visual artist and performer
 June 13 - Joshua Davis, American visual artist and designer
 September 2 – Arnold Arre, Filipino comic book writer and artist
 September 7 – Sirpa Masalin, Finnish sculptor
 September 13 – Stella McCartney, English fashion designer
 October 1 – Stéphane Breitwieser, French art thief
 October 3 – Oliver Briceño, Venezuelan oboist
 October 4 – Jeremy Blake, American digital artist and painter (died 2007)
 October 16 – Mirko Reisser (DAIM), German graffiti-artist
 October 27 – Jade Arcade, American composer, musician, and comic book artist
 December 6 – Helena Bulaja, Croatian multimedia artist
 date unknown
 Ahmed Al Safi, Iraqi sculptor
 Amanda Coogan, Irish performance artist
 Bernhard Gál, Austrian composer and artist

Deaths
 January 10 – Coco Chanel, French fashion designer (born 1883)
 January 11 – I. Rice Pereira, American painter, (born 1902)
 February 7 – Emy Roeder, German sculptor (born 1890)
 April 1 – Ramiro Arrue, Basque painter, illustrator, and ceramist (born 1892)
 April 3 – Jacques Ochs, French artist, Olympic fencing gold medallist (born 1883)
 April 11 – Marcel Gromaire, French painter (born 1892)
 May 31 – Norman Wilkinson, English marine artist (born 1878)
 June 14 – Gerald Dillon, Irish painter (born 1916)
 July 7 – Ub Iwerks, American animator, cartoonist and special effects technician (born 1901)
 July 12 – Kiyoshi Yamashita, Japanese outsider artist (born 1922)
 August 27 – Margaret Bourke-White, American photographer and photojournalist (born 1904)
 October – Charles Walter Simpson, English painter of nature and teacher (born 1885)
 November 9 – Ceri Richards, Welsh painter (born 1903)
 December 6 – Jan Altink, Dutch painter (born 1885)

References

See also
 1971 in fine arts of the Soviet Union

 
Years of the 20th century in art
1970s in art